Jackson's chameleon (Trioceros jacksonii), also known as Jackson's horned chameleon, three-horned chameleon or Kikuyu three-horned chameleon, is a species of chameleon (family Chamaeleonidae) native to East Africa, and introduced to Hawaii, Florida, and California.

Taxonomy
Jackson's chameleon was described by Belgian-British zoologist George Albert Boulenger in 1896.

Etymology
The generic name, Trioceros, is derived from the Greek τρί- (tri-) meaning "three" and κέρας (kéras) meaning "horns".  This is in reference to the three horns found on the heads of males.

The specific name, jacksonii, is a Latinized form of English explorer and ornithologist Frederick John Jackson's last name, who was serving as the first Governor of Kenya at the time.

The English word chameleon (also chamaeleon) derives from Latin chamaeleō, a borrowing of the Ancient Greek χαμαιλέων (khamailéōn), a compound of χαμαί (khamaí) "on the ground" and λέων (léōn) "lion".  The Greek word is a calque translating the Akkadian nēš qaqqari, "ground lion".

Subspecies
The three subspecies, including the nominate, are:
 T. j. jacksonii  – Jackson's chameleon
 T. j. merumontanus  – dwarf Jackson's chameleon
 T. j. xantholophus  – yellow-crested Jackson's chameleon

Habitat and geographic range

Day temperatures are typically , and night temperatures are typically . In Tanzania, it is known only from Mount Meru in the Arusha Region, which is the home of the relatively small endemic subspecies T. j. merumontanus. Jackson's chameleon is more widespread in Kenya, where it is even found in wooded areas of some Nairobi suburbs. The subspecies T. j. xantholophus (native to the Mount Kenya region) was introduced to Hawaii in 1972 and has since established populations on all main islands and became an invasive species there. This subspecies has also been introduced to Florida. Historically this population was the primary source of Jackson's chameleons for the exotic pet trade in the United States, but exports from Hawaii are now illegal. This has been done to prevent opportunists from willfully establishing further feral animal populations to capture and sell them.

Description

Jackson's chameleons are sometimes called three-horned chameleons because males possess three brown horns: one on the nose (the rostral horn) and one above each superior orbital ridge above the eyes (preocular horns), somewhat reminiscent of the ceratopsid dinosaur genus Triceratops. The females generally have no horns, or instead have traces of the rostral horn (in the subspecies T. j. jacksonii and T. j. merumontanus).  The coloring is usually bright green, with some individual animals having traces of blue and yellow, but like all chameleons, they change color quickly depending on mood, health, and temperature.

It has a saw-tooth shaped dorsal ridge and no gular crest. It attains sexual maturity after five months. The lifespan is variable, with males generally living longer than females.

The largest subspecies of Jackson's chameleon is T. j. xantholophus, which has been captively bred since the 1980s.

Ecology

Feeding habits
Jackson's chameleons live primarily on a diet of small insects. They also prey on centipedes, isopods, millipedes, spiders, lizards, small birds, and snails in their native habitat.

Invasive species
There is a threat of devastating impact of introduced invasive Jackson's chameleons to native ecosystems in Hawaii. They were found with  mainly insects in their stomachs: planthoppers Oliarus, grasshoppers Banza, casebearing caterpillars Hyposmocoma, beetles Oodemas, dragonflies Pantala and others. Holland et al. (2010) proved that they also prey on snails in Hawaii. Their prey includes land snails Achatinella, Auriculella, Lamellidea, Philonesia, Oxychilus alliarius. They are swallowing whole snails (including shells). Jackson's chameleons introduced to Hawaii are a substantial threat to native biodiversity of invertebrates and a serious threat especially to endemic species, such as critically endangered O'ahu tree snails (genus Achatinella).

Territoriality
T. jacksonii are less territorial than most species of chameleons.  Males will generally assert dominance over each other through color displays and posturing in an attempt to secure mating rights, but usually not to the point of physical fights.

Reproduction
Most chameleons are oviparous, but Jackson's chameleon are viviparous, giving birth to offspring soon after they are ready to hatch from their egg sac; eight to thirty live young are born after a five- to six-month gestation. The subspecies T. j. merumontanus gives birth to five to ten live young.

In captivity

In captivity, Jackson's chameleons require high humidity, and are in general very needy of colder temperatures during the night. Too much heat, or excessive humidity, can cause eye infections and upper respiratory infections in these animals. In captivity, the Jackson's chameleon can be expected to live between five and ten years.

References

External links

 
  Jackson's Chameleon Care Information at Caresheets.net
 Chamaeleo jacksonii information from HEAR
 Preliminary study of the behavior and ecology of Jackson's chameleons of Maui, Hawaii (Dr. George H. Waring, Dept. of Zoology, Southern Illinois University)

Trioceros
Reptiles described in 1896
Taxa named by George Albert Boulenger
Lizards of Africa
Reptiles of Kenya
Reptiles as pets
Reptiles of Tanzania